Staatliche Kunstsammlungen Dresden (Dresden State Art Collections) is a cultural institution in Dresden, Germany, owned by the State of Saxony. It is one of the most renowned and oldest museum institutions in the world, originating from the collections of the Saxon electors in the 16th century.

Today, the Dresden State Art Collections consists of fifteen museums. Most of them are located in the Dresden Castle, the Zwinger and the Albertinum.

History 

The museums belonging to the Staatliche Kunstsammlungen Dresden originated from the collections of the Saxon electors, several of whom were also Kings of Poland. Historical sources show that August I, Elector of Saxony, founded the electoral Kunstkammer (literally “art chamber”) in 1560, a collection of art located in the Dresden Castle. August the Strong and his son, August III, Kings of Poland, were important patrons and remarkable connoisseurs of the arts. They developed their art collections in a systematic fashion; in the process, they not only provided a foundation of extraordinary masterpieces for the Staatliche Kunstsammlungen Dresden, but also made these works accessible to select circles in their own time.

The Staatliche Kunstsammlungen has been a state-owned enterprise since January 1, 2009. The association includes twelve museums which operate independently within the context of their own collection, but all share various institutions and facilities as well as a central administration.

Museums 
Twelve museums belong to the Staatliche Kunstsammlungen Dresden.

Painting galleries 
 Gemäldegalerie Alte Meister (Old Masters Painting Gallery), Zwinger 
 Galerie Neue Meister (New Masters Gallery), Albertinum
 Kupferstich-Kabinett (Collection of Prints, Drawings and Photographs), Dresden Castle

Art museums 
 Grünes Gewölbe (Green Vault) with the Historic and the New Green Vault, Dresden Castle
 Mathematisch-Physikalischer Salon (Royal Cabinet of Mathematical and Physical Instruments), Zwinger (west wing)
 Rüstkammer (Armory) with the Turkish Chamber, Dresden Castle 
 Porzellansammlung (Porcelain Collection), Zwinger (Glockenspielpavillon)
 Münzkabinett (Numismatic Cabinet or Coin Cabinet), Dresden Castle
 Skulpturensammlung (Sculpture Collection), Albertinum
 Kunstgewerbemuseum (Arts and Crafts Museum), Pillnitz Castle

Ethnographic museums 
 State Ethnographical Collections with the Dresden Museum of Ethnology in the Japanese Palace, the Leipzig Museum of Ethnography and the Museum of Ethnography Herrnhut
 Museum für Sächsische Volkskunst and Puppentheatersammlung (Saxon Folk Art Museum and Puppet Theatre Collection), Jägerhof

Further institutions, such as the Kunstbibliothek (Art Library), the Kunstfonds (Art Fund) and the Gerhard Richter Archiv (Gerhard Richter Archive) also belong to the Staatliche Kunstsammlungen Dresden.

Directors 
 1955–1968: Max Seydewitz
 1968–1989: Manfred Bachmann
 1990–1997: Werner Schmidt
 1998–2001: Sybille Ebert-Schifferer
 2001–2011: Martin Roth
 2012–March 2016: Hartwig Fischer
 Since November 2016: Marion Ackermann

Locations 

The museums of the Staatliche Kunstsammlungen are housed in six buildings. With the exception of Pillnitz Castle, they are all located in the historic center of Dresden.

Dresden Castle houses the Historic Green Vault (Historisches Grüne Gewölbe) and the  New Green Vault (Neues Grüne Gewölbe), the Numismatic Cabinet (Münzkabinett), the Collection of Prints, Drawings and Photographs (Kupferstich-Kabinett), and the Armory (Rüstkammer) with the Turkish Chamber (Türckische Cammer).

The Zwinger palace contains the Old Masters Picture Gallery (Gemäldegalerie Alte Meister), the Porcelain Collection (Porzellansammlung), and the Royal Cabinet of Mathematical and Physical Instruments (Mathematisch-Physikalischer Salon).

The Albertinum hosts the New Masters Gallery (Galerie Neue Meister) and the Sculpture Collection (Skulpturensammlung).

Pillnitz Castle houses the Arts and Crafts Museum (Kunstgewerbemuseum) and the Japanisches Palais the Ethnographical Museum Dresden (Museum für Völkerkunde). The Saxon Folk Art Museum and Puppet Theatre Collection (Museum für Sächsische Volkskunst and Puppentheatersammlung) can be found in the Jägerhof in Dresden-Neustadt.

Current status 

The Staatliche Kunstsammlungen Dresden is owned by the State of Saxony. It is a member of the Konferenz Nationaler Kultureinrichtungen, a union of more than twenty cultural institutions in the former East Germany.

Provenance Research and Restitutions 
In the museums of the Dresden State Art Collections, the provenances of all acquisitions of works of art since 1933 are systematically investigated as part of the "Daphne" research, recording and inventory project. In 2020, the SKD restituted three graphic works from the Kupferstich-Kabinett to the family of Carl Heumann (1886-1945). Other restitutions are planned, but due to the covid epidemic, the transfer of two watercolor drawings with religious motifs by Peter Fendi (1796-1842) and an oil study of a girl with a parrot by Jakob Gensler (1808-1848) to the descendants of the former owner living in the USA and Great Britain have been postponed.

References

External links

 Official website of the Staatliche Kunstsammlungen Dresden
 Virtual Tour of the Historic Green Vault, Turkish Chamber, Porcelain Collection, Old Masters Painting Gallery (English version upper right)